Mavli is a town in Mavli tehsil of Udaipur district in Rajasthan, India.

Mavli Junction railway station is an important station under Ajmer railway division of North Western Railway zone of Indian Railways. It connects Marwar Junction , Chittaurgarh junction, Bari Sadri and Udaipur city.
New residential colonies have come up around railway station. The town has a Navodaya Vidyalaya. The town has temple of Laxmi Narayan, Shriramji- Seetamata-Laxmanji (Akhada), Thirthankar Chanda Prabhu Swamy (Jain Temple), lok temples like Adra Bavji, Radaji Bawji and Chamunda Mata.
There is a famous bawri (step well) known as Bai Raj Ki Bawri. Baijiraj Bawri was built by mother and sister of Rana Bhim Singhji between 1772 to 1780.  This Bawri was given in dowry to Baijiraj Chandrawatiji.

Over the years rainfall has declined and potable water is a big problem. Two ponds near the village namely Naya Talab (Hemsagar) and Nathela hardly get rainwater. Another big pond meant for irrigation namely Bagolia also remains dry, it was last overflown in 1973.

The town is famous for its Sweet Rabdi.

During early post-independence time after Udaipur and Dabok, it was Mavli, which had school up to middle level.

Political
The town is a Tehsil headquarters, having Panchayat Samiti and also subdivision office under Udaipur district. It is a Vidhan Sabha (State Legislative Assembly) seat and Shanti Lal Chaplot was elected from this seat.
This town falls in the Chittaurgarh Lok Sabha constituency.

References

 https://web.archive.org/web/20110726135030/http://www.gwssb.org/impact/vadodara.pdf
 http://vadodaradp.gujarat.gov.in/vadodara/english/dabhoi.htm
 https://archive.today/20150118164000/http://mavlijunction.in/
 https://udaipurtimes.com/stepwell-in-mavli-a-neglected-testimony-of-the-medieval-era/
 MK Kothari
Cities and towns in Udaipur district